Alton Towers Resort (often referred to as Alton Towers) is a theme park and resort complex in Staffordshire, England, near the village of Alton. The park is operated by Merlin Entertainments Group and incorporates a theme park, water park, spa, mini golf and hotel complex. In 2021, it ranked first for attendance among amusement parks in the UK, with an estimated 1.8 million visitors.

Originally a private estate of the Earls of Shrewsbury, Alton Towers' grounds were opened to the public in 1860 to raise funds. In the late 20th century, it was transformed into a theme park and opened a number of new rides from 1980 onwards. The park has many attractions such as Congo River Rapids, Runaway Mine Train, Nemesis, Oblivion, Galactica, The Smiler, Wicker Man, Rita and TH13TEEN. It operates a total of ten roller coasters and offers a range of accommodation and lodging options alongside the theme park. Facilities include Alton Towers Waterpark, conference facilities and a crazy golf course.

The theme park is open seasonally from mid-March to early November, whilst many of its hotels and amenities are open year-round. Special events are hosted throughout the year, including Alton Towers Scarefest (the park's Halloween event), Octoberfest, and Mardi Gras.

History 

Alton Towers first opened to the public on a regular basis following the opening of Alton Towers railway station. Money raised from railway excursions was paid to the earl and helped to maintain the upkeep of the grounds.

In 1924, a group of local estate agents formed Alton Towers Ltd to take ownership of the estate and began to restore the gardens as a tourist attraction. In the 1950s, this included the operation of a fairground, and by the 1970s included a boating lake and chairlift.

Property developer John Broome acquired the park after marrying the daughter of majority shareholder Dennis Bagshaw in 1973 and subsequently buying all its concessions. From there, he began the theme park by developing new areas and installing permanent rides, including the Corkscrew, The Flume, Around The World In 80 Days, The Black Hole and the Grand Canyon Rapids.

In 1990, Broome sold Alton Towers to The Tussauds Group, then a division of Pearson plc, after his development of the former Battersea Power Station encountered financial difficulty. The change of park ownership brought another era of development, involving the opening of new themed areas and attractions, such as Runaway Mine Train (1992), The Haunted House (1992), Toyland Tours (1994), and Nemesis (1994). Tussauds' park development team from 1990 to 2002 included attraction producer John Wardley among others.

The Tussauds Group was sold to venture capital firm Charterhouse in 1998. The opening of Oblivion that same year and Air (now Galactica) in 2002 saw the park sustain new major roller coasters, both marketed as 'World First' rides. In 2005, Dubai International Capital (DIC) acquired Tussauds for £800 million.

In May 2007, The Blackstone Group purchased The Tussauds Group for US$1.9 billion and merged it with its then-subsidiary Merlin Entertainments. Dubai International Capital also gained 20% of Merlin Entertainment.

On 17 July 2007, Alton Towers was sold to private investor Nick Leslau's investment firm Prestbury under a sale and leaseback agreement. Merlin continues to operate the site under a renewable 35-year lease. As of 2016, the property is under control of Secure Income REIT plc, of which Nick Leslau is a non-executive director.

As of early 2008 the resort changed its name to 'Alton Towers Resort' to better reflect its status as a multi-day destination. Most other Merlin-owned theme parks with onsite hotels would follow the same course over the following few years. In 2020, Alton Towers operated on a shortened season due to the COVID-19 pandemic, operating on a limited capacity from July 4 through November.

Rides and attractions

Roller coasters

Ride statistics

Flat rides

Temporary flat rides 
Alton Towers rented four temporary flat rides for the 2021 season to help with capacity. Three of these were part of the "Retro Squad". Flavio's Fabulous Fandango, Funk'n'Fly and Roller Disco all returned for the 2022 season. Mixtape did not return for 2022, and was instead replaced by a new ride, Spinjam. 
Flavio’s Fabulous Fandango, Funk'n'Fly and Spinjam all returned for 2023. It was confirmed on 16 March 2023 that Roller Disco would be replaced with Twistatron, with the new ride being located on the former Enterprise site, adjacent to Spinjam.

Water/Dark rides

Children's rides

Theme park transport and grounds

Past rides and attractions

Past roller coasters

Main Past Attractions

Other notable past rides 

 Adventure Playground 1974–1993
 Adventure Railway ( gauge) 1982–1992
 Alpine Bob Sled 1980–1986
 Astroglide mid-1970s–1992
 Barney's Playground 2000–2002
 The Blue Carousel 1981–1991
 Bob the Builder's Playground 2006
 Bouncing Bugs 1982–2008
 Cable Cars (open air) 1964–1986
 Cine 360 1981–1987
 Cine 2000 1980–1992
 Cred Street Carousel 2000–2005
 Cred Street Playground 2006–2008
 Dinosaurs 1980–1983
 Doll's House 1981–1995
 Fantastic Fountains 1981–1992
 Ferris wheel 1985–1986
 Gravitron 1990–1992
 Magic Carpet 1984–1985
 Magic Show 1980–1986
 Miniature Golf 1980–1994
 Mississippi Showboat 1985–1996
 Mixtape 2021
 Model Railway 1957–1992
 Motor Museum 1987–1992
 Nickelodeon: Outta Control 1997–1998
 Nina's Science Lab 2014–2018
 Octopus 1984–1991
 Old MacDonald's Singing Barn 1995–2013
 Old MacDonald's Tractor Ride 1995–2013
 Park Railway ( narrow gauge) 1953–1996
 Paddling Pool 1963–1992
 Peter Rabbit and Friends on Ice 1994–2001
 Planetarium 1972–1987
 Rowing Boats 1923–1996
 Sea Lions 1957–1990
 Space Boat 1983
 Spider 1986–1991
 Splash Cats 1966–1996
 Splash Karts 2004–2007
 Sun Liner Trains 1984–1986
 Swan Boats 1987–2003
 Tea Cup Ride 1986-2007
 Thunderbirds 1982–1990
 Towers Express 1974–1983
 Tri-Star 1989–1992
 Turbo Star 1984–1989
 Tweenies Playground 2003–2005
 Vintage Cars 1983–2005
 Wobble World 2009–2015
 3D Cinema 1981–2004
 1001 Nights 1985–1994

Food facilities 

 Theme Park
 Towers Street: Costa Coffee, Towers Street Hot Dogs, Towers Street Doughnuts, Treats, Coca Cola Freestyle
 CBeebies Land: Little Explores Lunch Box, Big Fun Showtime Snack box 
 X-Sector: Just Chicken, Donut Factory, Rehydrator, Coca Cola Freestyle
 The Towers: Burger Kitchen, Archway, Front Lawns, Coca Cola Freestyle
 Dark Forest: Woodcutters Bar and Grill, Eastern Express, Tormented Treats, Coca Cola Freestyle
 The Wonderful World Of David Walliams: David Walliams World Ice Cream
 Forbidden Valley: Rollercoaster Restaurant, Costa Coffee, Nemices Donuts, Forbidden Valley Refresh, Coca Cola Freestyle
 Gloomy Wood: 
 Katanga Canyon: Explorers Pizza and Pasta Buffet, Coca Cola Freestyle
 Mutiny Bay: Burger Kitchen, Costa Coffee, Welcome Inn, Eastern Express, Courtyard Hot Dogs/Wraps/Waffles, Mutiny Bay Doughnuts, Pirates Kiosk, Coca Cola Freestyle
 Accommodation
 Alton Towers Hotel: Secret Garden Restaurant, Costa Coffee, Dragons Bar, Captains Bar
 Alton Towers Conference Centre: Algenon's Bar, Sir Algenon's Grill (Only open in peak times)
 Splash Landings Hotel: Flambos Jambo, Ma Garrita's Bar, Costa Coffee, Burger Cove
 Enchanted Village: Crooked Spoon
 CBeebies Land Hotel: The Windmill Restaurant
 Stargazing Pods: Stargazing Bar
 Midway Attractions
 Alton Towers Waterpark: The Cave, Ice Cream Shack
 Tree Top Quest: The Crooked Teaspoon

Past food facilities 
Alton Towers previously had leases with High Street outlets, which have since been replaced by in-house brands such as Explorers Pizza & Pasta, Just Chicken and Burger Kitchen.
 McDonald's (1998–2007)
 Burger King (2008–2012)
 Pizza Hut (1998–2008)
 KFC (1998–2011)
 Fried Chicken Co. (2011–2018)
 Forest Feasts (2010–2016)
 Courtyard Tavern (2008–2016)
 Towers Street Bar and Grill (1985–2016)
 Nitrogenie (2015–2021)
 Cloud Cuckoo Land Café (2008–2021)
 Gloomy Wood Kiosk (1992–2021)

Alton Towers Theme Park 

The Alton Towers Theme Park is divided into areas: Towers Street, Mutiny Bay, Katanga Canyon, Gloomy Wood, Forbidden Valley, Dark Forest, The Gardens, The Towers, The World of David Walliams, X-Sector and CBeebies Land. The SkyRide cable car system travels between Towers Street, Forbidden Valley, and the Towers and takes in views of the gardens.

The park's maximum capacity at any one time is set at 28,000 guests. According to the TEA attendance report, the park was estimated to have attracted 2,130,000 people in 2019, a 1.4% increase on 2018's figure of 2,100,000. This made Alton Towers Britain's 2nd most visited theme park, after Legoland Windsor, and the 13th most visited theme park in Europe. Annual admissions surpassed 3 million in both 1994 and 2010, when the Nemesis and Thirteen rollercoasters were opened respectively.

Timeline of park areas

  Previous themed area

  Current themed area

Towers Street 
Opened in 1986, Towers Street is the first area that visitors to the park encounter. Themed loosely as a town street, it leads to views of the gardens and the Towers across the lake in the distance. Along the pathway are the park's jumping frog fountains and a lawn where seasonal events take place. The monorail moves guests from the four on-site hotels and the water park to the theme park; it opened 1987 and was refurbished in 2008. In this area during the hour before the park's daily closure, departing guests are entertained by three people wearing police costumes, two of them riding Segway-like vehicles which play party music and the third standing with an old-fashioned megaphone that is unused, and a man riding a miniature ship while dressed as a sea captain.

Katanga Canyon 
Themed as an African village; created in 1992 and incorporated existing rapids ride. Rides include the roller coaster Runaway Mine Train and Congo River Rapids. Both are well-established rides in the park whose ride tracks share a tunnel. Congo River Rapids is a river rapids ride that opened 1986, as The Grand Canyon Rapids, and was refurbished in 1992. A 735 m long wild river rapids ride down the Congo River that lasts six minutes. It was designed by John Wardley for Tussauds and manufactured by Mack Rides.

Gloomy Wood 
Gloomy Wood serves as the area for the dark ride Duel - The Haunted House Strikes Back!, originally The Haunted House. Opening in 1992, this was originally Europe's largest haunted dark ride, but was significantly altered with interactive laser guns in 2003. Each player's shooting score was recorded on a display in the ride car, as guests shot targets throughout the layout. The ride closed in September 2022 for refurbishment. For the 2023-2024 season, “Duel” reopened as “The Curse at Alton Manor”. Following the story of Emily Alton, who featured in the original Haunted House attraction in the ride queue.
In 2007, a themed footpath through the woods was added to the area, named Haunted Hollow. The pathway follows the route formerly used by the park's old scenic railway, linking from Mutiny Bay. Haunted Hollow includes tombstones, statues and other features, some of which interact with guests using sound effects. In July 2015, Nitrogenie opened and replaced the old Waffles and Ices, a shop producing ice cream using liquid nitrogen. Gloomy Wood was suggested by the 2017 park map to be home to the new Wicker Man wooden coaster, opening 2018. However, the park later stated that the ride was in Mutiny Bay.

Forbidden Valley 

Forbidden Valley is set in a 'post-apocalyptic' landscape, with standing stones and rustic structures populating the 'valley'. A SkyRide station also serves this area of the park.

The area's principal attraction is Nemesis, opened in 1994. Nemesis is a steel inverted coaster that reaches a speed of 50 mph (81 km) with four inversions, set in a rocky quarry over waterfalls. The ride is built down into excavated ground and was designed by Tussauds, primarily John Wardley. The attraction is themed as an alien creature inhabiting the quarry where the coaster is situated.

The Blade is a Huss Pirate Boat modified with a pendulum blade. It opened in 1980, and was relocated to the area in 1997 from Fantasy World. The Blade currently operates as the only flat ride in Forbidden Valley since the removal of Ripsaw. However, in October 2019, The Blade was dismantled to be 'Resharpened by the Phalanx' and has since returned to its pit after a refurbishment.

Galactica is a B&M flying coaster, originally opening as Air in 2002. Air was loosely themed as a peaceful landscape, distanced from the 'apocalyptic' look of Nemesis. Air was redesigned as Galactica in 2016, adopting virtual reality headsets and a space travel theme. The VR headsets have since been removed due to feedback from customers.

In May 2016, the 'Rollercoaster Restaurant' opened, offering a dining experience where guests have their food delivered by looping rails. The restaurant is open daily from 10am - 9:30pm; available to guests without theme park admission after the park has closed, except during Scarefest and Fireworks events.

Adventure Land 
Adventure Land is a small family area featuring Spinball Whizzer; based on a pinball machine in which the car is the ball whizzing around the machine. The ride originally had this name, until 2010 when it was known as Sonic Spinball until the name change back in 2016 when a contract ended with SEGA after six years. The ride is a Maurer Söhne spinning roller coaster, in which riders sit in cars that can spin on their base whilst travelling at speed around the track. Spinball Whizzer is now part of The Towers, alongside Cuckoo Cars Driving School, Hex and the Alton Towers Dungeon.

Adventure Land is named after the adventure play ground which previously sat on the site. The former play area was one of the attractions of a larger area called Kiddies Kingdom. In 1996, Kiddies Kingdom was split into Adventure Land and Storybook Land.

*This area as of 2017 is considered part of The Towers*

X-Sector 

X-Sector is themed as a secretive industrial complex, suggested to be subjecting park guests to experimental testing.

The area currently contains three thrill rides. The steel dive coaster Oblivion which opened in 1998 as "the world's first vertical drop rollercoaster", designed by Tussauds and manufactured by Bolliger & Mabillard. The cars are held over the edge of the drop for between one and three seconds, before diving into a deep tunnel. The Smiler is a Gerstlauer Infinity Coaster which opened in May 2013 and currently holds the world record for most inversions on a roller coaster at 14. The area layout was partially altered in 2013 season to accommodate the opening of The Smiler.

Previous rides in X-Sector include The Black Hole, which was a Jet Star 2 coaster enclosed in a tent, where The Smiler is located today. Energizer (later renamed Boneshaker) was a swinging gondola flat ride. It was replaced by Submission in 2001, a "Chance Double Inverter" flat ride, which was itself removed in 2014. Enterprise was a standard HUSS Enterprise model which opened in 1984, spinning riders 360 degrees and giving the illusion of defying gravity. It was permanently removed from the resort in 2022.

Mutiny Bay 

Mutiny Bay is a pirate-themed family area, which opened in 2008. the area was a retheme for Merrie England.

Attractions in Mutiny Bay include: Battle Galleons, an interactive "Splash Battle" boat ride, where guests sit in tracked boats while soaking other riders with water cannons. Also in the area is the rocking boat ride, Heave Ho. The park's original teacups ride was re-themed to become Marauders Mayhem, with the tea cup cars being redesigned as gunpowder barrels. The Flume was a Mack log flume ride that opened in 1981 and was rethemed in 2004 with a sponsorship from Imperial Leather alongside Bubbleworks at Chessington World of Adventures. Late in the 2015 season, the ride and the neighboring tavern closed and were removed in 2016 to make way for the Wicker Man roller coaster and the "Welcome Inn" bar which shares the coaster's theme.

In 2009, a Sea Life Centre named Sharkbait Reef opened in the location previously home to the 3-D Cinema. This includes "touch pools" for interacting with underwater species and a  underwater tunnel.

The World of David Walliams 

The World of David Walliams opened in May 2021 and is aimed at younger children aged 7–11. It is based on the children's books by David Walliams. Attractions include Gangsta Granny: The Ride, Raj's Bouncy Bottom Burp (the former Frog Hopper) and Royal Carousel (previously Galloper's Carousel). The area has had various names over the years including "Cloud Cuckoo Land", "Cred Street" and "The Land of Make Believe", each had a similar a cartoon-inspired look, mainly featuring Toyland Tours. The area was first built as "Talbot Street" in 1981, becoming the park's first themed area, home to the Around The World in 80 Days and Doom & Sons dark rides. The World of David Williams also includes many of the author's hidden secrets such as one of the streets being called "Wallibums Way".

In October 2019, it was announced that Cloud Cuckoo Land will be replaced by "The World of David Walliams" for the 2020 season, which will feature attractions based around Walliams' series of children's books.

On May 29, 2020, it was announced that the opening of "The World of David Walliams" would be delayed from 2020 to the 2021 season due to the COVID-19 pandemic.

Another attraction, Flavio's Fabulous Fandango, was temporarily added to the land for opening. The land also features Raj's Shop and various outdoor entertainment.

Dark Forest 
The Dark Forest is themed as a supernatural woodland area; to coincide with the opening of TH13TEEN, a steel family coaster themed as a haunted crypt, that opened on 20 March 2010. Th13teen, features the "world's first freefall drop on a roller coaster" - an indoor, vertically dropping track element. The ride replaced the Corkscrew; the park's first roller coaster, which opened in 1980. Rita is a hydraulically launched steel sit-down coaster that reaches a top speed of 62 mph (100 km) that is now themed around an abandoned drag racer that is used to escape the Dark Forest.

The area was previously a cartoon prehistoric area named Ug Land, which opened in 1999, but was half-demolished to make way for Rita's construction in 2005. Rita used to be themed around drag racing but was changed with the opening of Th13teen and the Dark Forest. With the opening of Th13teen, the area was renamed as Dark Forest and further altered with a new colour scheme and entrance feature. Rita was also given a repainted control cabin and trains, shortening its name from "Rita - Queen of Speed".

CBeebies Land 

CBeebies Land is based on the BBC children's TV channel: CBeebies and opened on 24 May 2014. The area includes rides, shows and interactive experiences based on programmes from CBeebies, including In the Night Garden... and Postman Pat. Attractions in the area are: In the Night Garden Magical Boat Ride, Postman Pat's Parcel Post, Get Set Go Treetop Adventure, Something Special Sensory Garden, Numtums Number Go-Around, Charlie & Lola's Moonsquirters and Greendrops, Justin's House: Pie-O-Matic Factory, Mr Bloom's Allotment and Tree Fu Tom Training Camp. Shows at the Big Fun Show Time stage include: Mike the Knight, The ZingZillas and Nina and the Neurons.

In 2015, Octonauts Roller Coaster Adventure opened, it is an underwater themed children's roller coaster; built on the vacant site The Beastie roller coaster. CBeebies Land was further expanded in 2017 with the opening of the Go Jetters Vroomster Zoom Ride and The Furchester Hotel Live, and again in 2019 with the addition of Peter Rabbit Hippity Hop and Teletubbies Big Band Live Show. The Numtums Number Go-Around has since been rethemed to the Bugbie Go-Around.

The Towers 

The Towers are the ruins of Alton Towers stately home and are the source of the park's name. They belonged to the Talbot family as a stately home until 1924 and largely designed by Augustus Pugin, also noted for his work on the Palace of Westminster. The Towers are now in a state of disrepair following decades of neglect. The ruins are open to the public during most of the open season. However, some areas are closed off as part of a £1.1 million project in place to restore the oldest parts of the Towers. Key areas of The Towers include the banqueting hall, the chapel, conservatories, and Her Ladyship's Gardens.

Hex – The Legend of the Towers, a walk-through dark ride based within the ruins themselves, opened in 2000. The finale to the ride is a Vekoma Madhouse located away from the real Towers but themed as a secret vault. The storyline is based on a local legend about the chained oak tree, located in a nearby forest, and makes use of the history of the Towers. It draws its theme from the legend of the 15th Earl of Shrewsbury who was said to be cursed by a beggar woman to suffer death every time a branch falls from an old oak tree.

The Alton Towers Dungeon was added to the area in 2019. Since the openings of CBeebies Land and The World of David Walliams; Spinball Whizzer and Cloud Cuckoo Land have been part of the area.

Cuckoo Cars Driving School allows children to drive miniature electric cars around a themed road layout, featuring visual jokes along the way. A SkyRide station is located nearby Fountain Square, giving access to other areas of the park.

During the park's Halloween 'Scarefest' event multiple scare mazes operate within the Towers themselves. For 2018's Scarefest event these were; Sub Species: the End Games, and Altonville Mine Tours.

The Gardens 

Near the garden entrance is a cenotaph to the 15th Earl of Shrewsbury, who built Alton Towers and developed its gardens in the early 19th century. The monument features a marble bust with an inscription reading "He made the desert smile". Other landmarks include a Chinese Pagoda Fountain, The Swiss Cottage, Miniature 'Stonehenge', and orangeries.

Alton Towers Waterpark 

The Alton Towers Waterpark, formerly known as Cariba Creek, opened alongside the Splash Landings Hotel in 2003. It is a large (with 7 pools and 10 water slides), part-indoor and part outdoor waterpark themed as a tropical Caribbean lagoon. The waterpark features several fast slides, a lazy river, a giant tipping bucket and many other water features. Also located there are two food and drink venues: Adventures Cave and Ice Cream Shack. Unlike Chessington Zoo at the also Merlin operated Chessington World of Adventures Resort, a separate ticket is needed for waterpark access as it is not included with the theme park entrance price.

Attractions include Lagoona Bay, which is the main tropical pool, with water cannons, geysers and waterfalls. The Little Leak is a paddling pool for young children with two small slides and interactive pipes to play with, while Wacky Waterworks Treehouse is a wooden 'treehouse' with water cannons, and other interactive features to squirt passing people with.

The largest ride in the Waterpark is the water coaster The Master Blaster, with uphill sections similar to the Master Blaster at Sandcastle Waterpark, Blackpool and Nucleus at Water World, Stoke-on-Trent. The Master Blaster is a high speed water flume that contains sharp turns, drops and dark sections, and has views of the entire indoor area of the waterpark.

Other rides include Rush & Rampage, twin racing slides where riders experience wide turns. This attraction requires rubber rings. Lazy River (Calypso Creek) is a slow-moving water circuit, taking riders underneath spraying water jets and tipping buckets of water. Rubber rings are available. The Tipping Bucket is a container filled with 1000 litres of water which regularly tips its contents over people standing below. Flash Floods are tiered outdoor pools with two slides leading to the middle pool and three leading to the bottom. Other swimming pools include Volcanic Springs, and indoor heated hot pool, and Bubbly Wubbly Pool, an outdoor heated pool and whirlpool.

The indoor section of the water park operates 12 months a year excluding Christmas Day and Boxing Day, although it closes for winter maintenance for around 2 weeks each January.

Resort accommodation

Alton Towers Hotel 
The Alton Towers Hotel opened on 10 April 1996 and is themed to the eccentric fictional character Sir Algenon Alton and his travels. The rooms are decorated in a quirky English style with pictures of Sir Algenon's inventions. The hotel is four star and has 180 rooms. The hotel was the first phase in a plan to turn the theme park into a multi-day resort.

Contained within this hotel are three different room types consisting of 'Explorer', 'Arctic Explorer', 'Moon Voyager'. In addition to these types, there are also limited availability rooms including; two rooms themed around the works of Beatrix Potter 'Benjamin Bunny' and 'Peter Rabbit', Spa themed rooms 'Dreamy Den' and 'Hidden Hideaway', four Gangsta Granny rooms and, one each of The Chocolate Suite, The Sleepover Suite, The Coca-Cola Suite, Splish Splash Suite, Big Pyjama Suite, The Smiler Room, Arabian Nights Suite and, Princess Room.

Due to the ongoing long term phased refurbishment, the number of 'Explorer' rooms are being reduced and converted into new theme with each floor getting its own appearance. So far, the plan has produced the Moon Voyage Bedrooms and Arctic Explorer Bedrooms.

The 'Emporium' is the shop within the Alton Towers Hotel, selling toiletries such as toothbrushes, toothpaste, razors, shaving cream, shampoo, conditioner, nappies, wipes and other sanitary products. Also sold here is a selection of merchandise covering the majority of the main rides on the Theme Park, a selection of ice creams, drinks and sweets. This shop appears to be the only one that stays open throughout the entire day from about 7am until 10pm (07:00 to 22:00).

Splash Landings Hotel 
The Splash Landings Hotel opened in 2003. The hotel has a relaxed Caribbean theme and is attached to the Alton Towers Waterpark.

It also has a four star rating and houses 216 rooms with six-room types to choose from. These consist of Family of 4 'Beachcomber' room, Family of 6 'Beachcomber' room, The Ice Age Room, The Pirate Room, Interconnected Family of 4 'Beachcomber' room and, Interconnected Family of 3 'Beachcomber' Room.

The interconnected rooms are all on the ground floor due to all of them either being an accessible or connecting to one, most of the accessible rooms are situated on the side facing the waterpark. Two of the Family of 6 rooms are also accessibility friendly, these are 1125 and 1134.

The rooms are numbered in the ranges of 1101 to 1159, 1201 to 1259, 1301 to 1359 and, 1401 to 1459, there are a few room numbers that are not used due to the shape of the hotel, these are 27, 29, 31, 33 and 35 on each floor.

There are two shops within this hotel, the main one is called 'The Shack'  and is adjacent to the reception desk, whereas the other is 'The Pool Shop' adjacent to the entrance to the Waterpark. As is probably to be expected, the Pool Shop specialises in items more focused upon the Waterpark such as swimming attire and buoyancy aids. The normal opening hours for the Pool Shop is from when the Waterpark opens until about 30 minutes after it closes.

The Shack is normally open in the morning when most people will be moving around before check out until about 11am (11:00), it then re-opens around 2pm (14:00) until 10pm (22:00). As with the Emporium, the Shack primarily sells toiletries as well as resort merchandise.

Enchanted Village 
The Enchanted Village is made up of 120 lodges and 5 secluded treehouses set in the fictional Enchanted Forest woodland. Situated next to the Alton Towers hotel, it features a variety of miniature playgrounds for children.

The site is also home to "The Crooked Spoon" restaurant, which typically serves the sort of food expected within a village pub style setting. Some of the more common meals include burgers (of the steak or bean variety), a simple tomato and basil pasta, a sirloin steak, butterfly chicken, or a cauliflower steak.

The village also plays host to the 'Lodge Shop' which sells items that would be expected for a nice summers evening relaxing outdoors including alcohol and outdoor activity toys. It appears that the Lodge Shop operates using different hours than the shop contained within the Alton Towers Hotel and Splash Landings Hotel.

The Enchanted Village opened to the public on 18 April 2015.

CBeebies Land Hotel 
The CBeebies Land Hotel opened on 8 July 2017 with a total of 76 themed rooms: 42 standard rooms (themed to the CBeebies Bugbies) and 34 premium rooms themed to CBeebies shows, such as Bing (new for 2022),Something Special and Swashbuckle. Room amenities include child-friendly features, such as steps up to the sink and children's toilet seats. The hotel features CBeebies-themed shows and entertainment, which run every day of the year, as well as the "Windmill Restaurant".

Within this hotel is 'The Toy Shop' which, contrary to its name, sells more than just toys and similar to the other shops on site, also sells ice creams, drinks and sweets. Due to it being within a hotel that caters more to a younger audience than the rest, its closing time reflects the, normally, earlier bed times for the occupants by being at 8pm (20:00).

Stargazing Pods 

Although Alton Towers had previously gained the necessary permits to expand the Enchanted Village, these plans were eventually scrapped and reduced into a "pod"-style accommodation option. 102 individual pods were constructed, each sleeping up to four people.

The proposals have faced some critical views from the public, with many criticisms being raised over the capacity of bathroom facilities as well as how the resort will cope with the increased demand in food and beverages, as the Stargazing Pods will not have its own restaurant, bar or shopping facilities. The council even initially rejected the application citing lack of imagination and "magic", although the plans were granted permission the second time without making any notable improvements.

The Stargazing Pods opened on 12 April 2019.

Recreation

Alton Towers Spa 
Alton Towers Spa is part of the Alton Towers Hotel and opened in 2004. It includes relaxation and treatment rooms and an adults only swimming pool. Despite being inside the Alton Towers Hotel, non-hotel guests are able to use the Spa.

Extraordinary Golf 
Opened in 2007, the Extraordinary Golf mini-golf attraction is themed to different rides and attractions at the park, some of which, are from the park's history. Extraordinary Golf is located to the west of the Splash Landings Hotel. Extraordinary Golf was refreshed for 2016 including the addition of a Galactica themed hole.

Tree Top Quest 
Opened May 2015, the Enchanted Forest Tree Top Quest is a high ropes course near the Enchanted Village. The attraction opened shortly after, and accompanies, the Enchanted Village development. There is also a low ropes course. Tree Top Quest did not open for the 2018 season or the start of the 2019 season due to budget cuts by parent company, Merlin Entertainments. It was expected to reopen on 13 July 2019 but has subsequently remained closed ever since. Its future status is unknown.

Future developments 

Alton Towers is located in a Conservation Area, which puts restrictions on its permissible development, notably that no structures in the park should be built above tree line and if so should be disguised from external views of the park; this can be seen on the ride Rita, where the highest sections of track are camouflaged green.

Noise pollution is also a problem for the park due to the close proximity to the villages of Alton and Farley and the town of Cheadle. There have been several cases where Alton Towers have been taken to court over the noise levels emitted from the park and have been served noise abatement orders between 2004 and 2006.

It has been confirmed by Alton Towers that Nemesis will close in November 2022 for an "exciting revamp" and will reopen in 2024.

In September 2022, Alton Towers held a public consultation to propose plans for a large indoor attraction on the former site of the Alton Mouse codenamed "Project Horizon". A decision on the proposed development is set to be made on 16 February. The Staffordshire Moorlands Council recommended the attraction be approved, subject to stringent planning conditions, in a committee report on 8 February 2023.

Secret Weapon roller coasters 
Alton Towers has a tradition of codenaming its new roller coaster developments as "Secret Weapon", or "SW", followed by a number. The name is associated with the park's inclination to promote its rides as holding "world first" or in some way "innovative" features and records. However the naming tradition actually began for unrelated reasons, since "Secret Weapon" was the working title of a roller coaster that was ultimately never commissioned.

SW1 was a pipeline roller coaster, planned to open in around 1992, on what later became the Nemesis site. It was provisionally titled the "Secret Weapon", with the intention of theming the ride as an ambiguous weapon testing facility. John Wardley rode the Arrow Dynamics prototype of their pipeline coaster, but stated "it was very slow and rather boring", as well as the requirement for such a high lift hill being unsuitable for the park's planning restrictions. After a second layout revision, labelled "SW2", the ride was scrapped and development on SW3 (Nemesis) began. The code name subsequently became the standard preliminary name for major roller coaster projects at the park.

The naming convention was briefly dropped while the Tussauds Group changed ownership under Dubai International Capital, before being continued by Merlin Entertainments beginning with the Thirteen rollercoaster in 2010.

Scarefest 
Scarefest is the resort's largest annual event. It celebrates Halloween with a number of temporary scare maze attractions, scare zones, costumed characters and extended opening hours. Rides and areas are lit with coloured lighting at night, with most rides and attractions continuing to operate until 9pm. The Scarefest event has been running since 2007, although the park started celebrating Halloween with decoration several years before and has operated the Terror of the Towers scaremaze since 2002. The scare mazes are upcharge attractions.

  Previous Scarefest maze
  Current Scarefest maze

*Terror of the Towers took a break in 2004, 2005 and 2006.

Seasonal Scarefest attractions as of 2022 
 The Invitation new experience for 2022. 
 Altonville Mine Tours: Uncover the Legend of the Skin Snatchers, live action horror maze, set in the baron town of Altonville. A family of inbred hillbillies are outcast due to their hideous disfigurement and warped way of life. Through desperation they begin capturing townsfolk, before removing their skin and stitching it into their own in a hope that this may finally give them the beauty they so desire. This is located in the basement of the towers, west wing replacing the haunting of Molly Crowe & is the oldest maze of the current line up.
 Darkest Depths - . Board the infamous ghost ship 'The Mutiny' and journey into the darkest depths to earn your piece of eight. The treacherous Sirens will try to lure you into the ocean as you dodge the swords of the mutinous ghost pirates and come face to face with the sea's meanest legend of all ... the Kraken! Operating as a family maze (10+) in the Mutiny Bat courtyard, then moving between Dark Forest & the gardens for 2020 due to Oktoberfest & then being rebranded as a thrill maze (15+) for 2021.
 The Attic: Terror of the Towers - . Return of the iconic maze with new storyline and route. Dare you venture up to The Attic in this live action maze where you'll discover the ghost of 'The Governess'! According to local legend, she tries to avenge the death of her charges by taking the spirits of the living as penance - will you be her next victim? Located in the attic of the towers after entering through the conservatory, it is the newest maze for the 'terror of the towers brand'.
Gardens Light walk: whispering souls - New for 2020. A night time walkthrough through the gardens. Mystery surrounds exactly what guests might encounter on their walk, but its promised that they will get the chance to witness the spectacle of the Historic Gardens in a whole new spooktacular light.
Trick O' Treat Town - New for 2021. Located in the former Charlie & the chocolate factory elevator scene, this Scarefest get ready to explore a special town where every day is Halloween! And do you know what's the townsfolk's favourite past time? Yes, you got it! It's to host Trick-or-Treating for the town visitors. So, muster up your courage and prepare to knock on doors from Spooky Avenue all the way up to the Witchy Woods but be careful! As well as treats there are tricks aplenty! In 2022, this attraction returned featuring HARBIO.

Past seasonal Scarefest attractions 
 Terror of the Towers. The first incarnation of this long-running annual scare maze was introduced in 2002, and was located in the Towers ruins themselves. Many scenes from the original maze are still used. Visitors walked through the long, winding corridors of the Towers, through themed scenes while being pursued by live actors. The finale featured a winding pathway around actors behind fences, who lunged towards visitors, accompanied with heavy strobe effects. For 2003 it was restructured and given the tagline and theme "Bloodfest Banquet".
 "TH13TEEN: After Dark" has an enhanced queue line for Alton Towers' newest roller coaster, using fog and lighting effects as well as live actors. This attraction did not return for 2012.
 Terror of the Towers – Bloodfest Banquet was a new version of the Terror of the Towers scare maze, running from 2003 to 2008. It retained much of the original version, but featured new scenes that included scripted dialogue from the several characters, and a new storyline was added. The strobe maze finale was moved to another point in the maze and replaced by a new ending, in which visitors become trapped in a small room with cages on every side, as actors reach for them through the metal bars for almost a minute. Every year, Terror of the Towers kept changing slightly with revised scenes and new scares. However, for the 2009 Scarefest event, Terror of the Towers was once again completely rethought, with the tagline "What Lies Within". The new incarnation drops the scripted scenes and characters; meaning it is similar to the original Terror of Towers of 2002. The whole layout for the maze was also reversed, with what was previously the entrance becoming the exit.
 Room 13 was first introduced in 2006 and was located in the conference room of the Alton Towers Hotel. It was only available to guests of the hotel, who were led around the maze as many live actors appeared to scare them. Room 13 had positive reviews and returned in 2007, but was replaced by The Boiler House in 2008.
 Field of 1000 Screams was first introduced in the 2007 Scarefest event and was the first maze at Alton Towers not situated inside a pre-existing building. The Field was located entirely outdoors in a moderately sized field of maize, which had to be planted especially for the event several months earlier. It purported to be a fictional village called Altonville that had become overrun by zombies. Visitors walked down a long pathway cut through the corn, and encountered characters and scares along the way, before the finale took place. The Field of 1000 Screams did not return for the 2010 event.
 Haunted Hollow Live was first seen in 2007 and consisted of several sinister, costumed actors performing along the Haunted Hollow walkway in Gloomy Wood. The attraction was similar to Duel Live, which was introduced the year later. Haunted Hollow Live returned for the 2008 Scarefest event, but was cancelled for 2009.
 Duel Live was first introduced in the 2008 Scarefest event. Throughout this period, the park's haunted house dark ride, Duel, became host to this attraction, which included live actors situated around the ride circuit. Duel was available to ride normally until 12 pm, when the laser guns and LED targets were switched and the actors took their positions. This was changed in 2009, when Duel Live took place throughout the whole day and many more actors than the previous year were present. Duel Live was aimed at the family audience, and included such features as new music playing throughout the ride (instead of the usual Duel theme music), as well as a butler or maid who would welcome you inside the house. The attraction was changed slightly for the 2010 season and featured the park's Scarefest mascots.
 Skelvin's Haunted Adventure was a newer version of Duel Live, introduced in 2010, and took over Duel – The Haunted House Strikes Back! throughout Scarefest. As in previous years, the attraction included live actors situated at different points around the ride. The laser guns and LED targets were switched off during this time. The ride featured the Scarefest mascots, notably the character of "Skelvin".
 The Boiler House was a scare maze first introduced in 2008, and was situated next to the Alton Towers Hotel. Originally, the scare maze was set in an abandoned industrial facility and featured live actors in make up. This was changed in 2009, when a new storyline was added. The scare maze later featured the fictional "Hamble Twins" serial killers hiding in the industrial building, and visitors have to escape them as they are chased through the scenes. Visitors queued outside, past a van labelled "Alton News 24", from which television screens play news reports on the activity of the serial killers. Guests then walk through a covered walkway, which hides the marquee that the maze is contained in from view. Once inside, a man appears and warns guests about the dangers of coming inside. The murderers then appear and kill him, before chasing visitors away. Each of the Twins are played by two actors wearing the same grotesque, latex mask. They appear at different points in the maze, creating the illusion that one character is in several places at once. Dim lighting and scent effects are heavily used. For the 2011 Scarefest, The Boiler House moved along with the Carnival of Screams to the X Sector, where they both shared the old Black Hole tent. After three years it did not return for the 2012 season.
 Carnival of Screams was a scare maze that debuted for the 2010 Scarefest event. During its debut it shared the same temporary building as the Boiler House. John Wardley contributed to the development of Carnival of Screams, which was entered through a large clown face with horrific features. For 2011 it and the Boiler House were relocated to the X-Sector area. The maze is a mixture of humor and serious scares, and the music used is the former Toy Land Tours attraction theme music warped for dramatic effect. From 2012 onwards, the attraction was situated opposite the hospitality suite, with the exit inside the Goal Striker unit. In 2013 and its final incarnation, the maze gained a theatrical ending involving a knife thrower.
 The Sanctuary was new for the 2012 Scarefest event and returned in 2013 and 2014. The attraction was set in a research facility operated by "The Ministry of Joy". Alton Towers released the following description at the time: "Lost your Smile? Then check yourself in for a refreshing check up at The Sanctuary. After being closed for new patients for almost 50 years The Sanctuary, The Ministry of Joy's earliest establishment, is now holding important trials searching for 'Advocates' for its 2013 project." It was revealed to be part of marketing for The Smiler roller coaster, which opened in 2013.
 Scary Tales Scare Zone was a walk through scare zone that ran for the 2014 event. The attraction setting revolved around fairy tale stories that were rewritten in a nightmarish manner.
 The Haunting of Molly Crowe, a multi-sensory maze set in the Towers ruins. The maze was based on the old and abandoned house of Molly Crowe, who was last seen engulfed in flames in the cellar of her house, emitting a scream of non-human origin. This ran for the 2015 event.
 Nox:Infernus Scare Zone, a scare zone which ran for the 2015 event, set in the Dark Forest. The underworld rises again - Will you join the Cult or face the end of the world as we know it?
 Dark Apocalypse Scare Zone, a scare zone which was first introduced for the 2015 event and returning in 2016. A deadly virus has spread across Forbidden Valley. The infected show signs of highly aggressive behavior and rapid physical decomposition. Phalanx control has quarantined the area however, a recent security breach has questioned their ability to contain the virus and keep society safe.
 Terror of the Towers – What Lies Within, the signature maze situated inside the Towers themselves, first introduced in 2002. A new format was introduced in the 2009 Scarefest event, along with the new tagline "What Lies Within" replacing "Bloodfest Banquet". Visitors queue outside in Her Ladyship's Gardens, and the attraction itself starts in the derelict Conservatories. Batches of guests watch a short video showing two men exploring the Towers for ghosts. The video then cuts short, and guests enter the Towers to find the men. At certain points in the maze, the bodies of the two men are each seen hanging from a noose. Visitors become lost in the lengthy corridors and themed scenes in the Towers, with live actors pursuing them in every room. The finale to the attraction is a maze-like walkway that winds around actors in cages, with strobe effects.
Freakshow, scare zone operating from 2016 to 2018. A side-show of circus rejects descended upon Alton Towers Resort, led by The Ring Master, with The Knife Thrower and The Bearded Lady just some of those who were waiting. However, it seems that they must have since found the attention they so desperately desired elsewhere. In 2019, Freak Show was a traveling vehicle with actors inside, which drove around the park's paths from Spinball Whizzer to Dark Forest. This attraction was brought back to the resort as a scare maze for the 2020 Scarefest event.
Sub Species: The End Games, Operating from 2015 - 2019. Descending deep underground to a post-apocalyptic sewer system that had been infested by a species from another world, guests became contestants in The End Games, a feeding ritual to appease the creatures' hunger that had been twisted into a sick contest over time. The sewer-dwellers would sacrifice innocent people from the surface, betting on their survival as guests chose their own route in an attempt to avoid the creatures that chased after them. This was located in the east of the towers with a shipping container extension to the ending and is seen as one of their most popular Scarefest attractions ever.
The Welcoming: be chosen, operating for 2017 & 2018 to advertise the opening of Wicker Man. Whispers around Alton village said that the group were angered by people abusing the world's natural resources and the rapid advance of technology. Every year the secluded group host a festival to celebrate their own interpretation of Halloween – paying homage to the earth and celebrating the crossover between the living world and the dead. Of course it was unknown what part the outsiders would play in this ritual… This was located in the Mutiny Bay courtyard as an outdoor maze before being replaced by Darkest Depths in 2019.
Project 42, operating for 2018 & 2019 using the former Nemesis Sub-Terra building and queue line with covering. Valiant volunteers were required to enter the underground compound in a bid to outwit what awaited them inside. They then needed to rescue the technician and find a vaccination for the escaped human test subjects, which had been infected by a mutant antidote, using every shred of courage and determination to get in and out without contracting the infection themselves.
House of Monsters, operating from 2016 - 2018 as the first 'family maze' and operated similar to the Alton Towers Dungeon with actor lead scenes. It all began after an online vlogger sought to become a modern day monster hunter after his investigations lead him to believe monsters existed and lived in a spooky disused house. Not brave enough to go alone, he asked his online followers to join him on his quest to the abandoned house to see if it was a case of mistaken identity or whether he'd really discovered a groups of 21st century ghouls. This was located in the former Wobble World building which is now home to Gangsta Granny: the ride.
Freakshow: Toxic Junkyard - New for 2020. After being hunted and chased away, the last of the Freak Show have gone into hiding, plotting in secret their next “BIG SHOW”. What for years appeared to be an old junkyard actually hides the secret that turns “townies” into evil carnies... Dare you volunteer to help stop their evil plan? Careful not to be captured though, or YOU will become the main attraction of the next show. This was a sequel to the Freakshow scare zone in the same location & was an outdoor maze with covered sections.

Other events 
In addition to Scarefest, Alton Towers also holds other events throughout the season. Currently, the park has five events taking place in the main season: Festival of Thrills, Mardi Gras, Oktoberfest, Scarefest, and Fireworks. There are also smaller events outside the main season, such as Christmas, which feature a limited ride offering and themed activities.

Fireworks 
For the final few days of the season, Alton Towers host firework shows, which have been running annually since the 1990s on the Great Lawns. The displays were considered disruptive by some local residents, which led to formal complaints - two of which decided to take the theme park to court regarding this issue. The court issued Alton Towers with a noise abatement order in October 2005 which limited the theme park to three shows a year, previously five, with noise readings not exceeding 40 decibels outside the park. In 2006, the display was rebranded as Electric Towers, but then discontinued. However, the fireworks and laser show was reinstated in 2010 to celebrate the park's 30th anniversary and has returned to being an annual event.

Oktoberfest 
The "Alton Towers Oktoberfest" started in 2020, taking place throughout September and early October. It is based on the German festival of Oktoberfest held traditionally in Munich, Germany. The event includes themed food and drink, entertainment and extended evening hours with selected rides open.

Mardi Gras 
This event launched in 2021 with a summer carnival theme, and is held from May to June. This event combines entertainment from the different 'Krewes' performing around the park & food street outside the towers with a large range of food trailers. The park is also decorated with Mardi Gras deco.

Festival of Thrills 
This was the new event for 2022. It took place from early April to early May. The idea of the event was to celebrate the seven thrill coasters with music. Four mini stages were set up; X-Sector (in front of Enterprise), Mutiny Bay (opposite Wicker Man), Dark Forest (between Rita & TH13TEEN) & Forbidden Valley (next to the Galactica portal). Throughout the day there were various performances of different musical styles, each representing one of the seven roller coasters.

The event will return in 2023, titled Festival of Thrills - The Smiler Takeover, to celebrate the 10th anniversary of The Smiler.

Santa's Sleepover 
During December, the Santa's Sleepover event takes place. Both resort hotels are decorated for the event and a pantomime takes place. The Alton Towers Theme Park also opens for Christmas with a small number of rides open as well as a Santa's Grotto. The event is largely aimed at children. In 2015, the theme park permitted entry to non-hotel guests for the first time however the event reverted to hotel guests only in 2016. Festive Breaks continue from 27 December to 6 January with a similar lineup to the Santa's Sleepovers.

February Half Term 
Prior to the main open season, Alton Towers held the February Half-Term event which saw a selected ride offering opened for the week before the start of the main season in March, however the event was cancelled for 2016; with the exception of Sharkbait Reef which was open for Pirate and Princess Week held at the Resort hotels.

More recently, Alton Towers has held regular Pirate & Princess Weekends during February Half-Term. The event entails decorations, and themed activities for children in the Hotels and the waterpark. The theme park's Sharkbait Reef aquarium also opens for the event.

Services Day 
Since 2015 Alton Towers have opened the park for a Services Day; a day where a limited quantity of discounted tickets (fewer than on a usual season day) are sold to those who work in public services such as the Police, NHS, Fire brigade, Prison service, Army, RAF, Royal Navy and other similar services. Services Day is usually held approximately two weeks prior to the start of the new season, which usually begins mid-March. Due to the success of the 2015, 2016 and 2017 Services Days, a two-day weekend of Services Days was planned for 3 and 4 March 2018, however this was postponed to 11 March due to weather conditions. Another two-day event took place on 16–17 March 2019. Services Days are open to holders of a Blue Light Card or a Defence Discount Service Card. Services Days for 2020 and 2021 were not held because of the COVID-19 pandemic. A further services' weekend took place in 2022 which included discounted hotel stays for the first time.

Concerts 
Alton Towers has a history of hosting concerts since the 1960s. Alternative rock band James played to a crowd of 30,000 on 4 July 1992. Concerts in recent years have included the Alton Towers Live event in 2011 and 2013. In 2010, there was a 1980s concert for the 30th Anniversary featuring Rick Astley and Bananarama and also that year hosted a P!nk concert. In the past these concerts were often held in the car park at an additional fee, however more recently concerts have been held within the theme park. Artists that have performed there include Tina Turner and The Black Eyed Peas.

Incidents

The Smiler 

In June 2015, sixteen people were injured on The Smiler ride, with two individuals requiring leg amputations. Merlin Entertainments originally released a press release blaming the crash on "human error." The Health and Safety Executive (HSE) concluded the crash occurred because "Merlin failed to put in place systems that allowed their engineers to work safely on the ride while it was running". During the subsequent court case, Merlin retracted their statement and pleaded guilty to a breach of health and safety law. The company was fined £5 million, with the court citing a "catalogue of errors" with Merlin's operating procedure and training. It is said that Merlin were blamed for rushing their employees and making them reduce down time as much as they possibly could.

In June 2017, Alton Towers estate owner Nick Leslau repeated the discredited claim that the crash was due to "a human error", but added that "Merlin has paid a massive price, but the performance of the business has been exemplary and the share price is now at an all-time high."

Sky Ride 
On 30 June 2004, due to a strong gust of wind, the Sky Ride cables became caught, jamming the ride. About 80 people were on the ride, and nine people had to be rescued by being abseiled down  cables.

On 28 October 2007, a fire broke out in the Forbidden Valley Skyride station due to a faulty Halogen light. It caused a power cut on the Monorail ride and also had destroyed the roof of the station. The forbidden valley section of the park was evacuated shortly after the fire.

On 21 July 2009, another fire broke out, this time in the Cloud Cuckoo Land station, due to a faulty vending machine. The fire completely gutted the entire building. While the park was closed, a new station was designed and built, ready for the 2010 season.

Runaway Mine Train 

On 20 July 2006, when the train was entering the tunnel section of its course, two carriages uncoupled, with the front half of the train continuing up the slope while the rear half remained stuck in the tunnel. The front half failed to make it over the hill, rolled back and crashed into the rear half which had remained stuck in the tunnel. Six people were taken to hospital and 23 others were treated for cuts and bruises. Following the incident the Runaway Mine Train was closed for the rest of the season. The train was only returned to full length operation in June the following year.

Court cases 
In 2011, a couple from the local village of Farley won the rights to a full High Court trial on the amount of noise generated by the park. The couple have been in legal battles with the park since 2004, and previously secured a noise abatement order on the theme park which led to the "Don't look down" audio from the top of the Oblivion drop being removed, and Alton Towers having to limit the amount of annual fireworks displays to only three a year.

Stephen and Suzanne Roper, who live 100 yards from the park, say that their lives have been made a misery by the noise of the screams as well as fireworks displays and music. They launched their legal fight in 2002, but after years of wrangling, their claim for an injunction and damages was thrown out in January 2011. Judge Mr Justice Hickinbottom later overturned that decision, bringing the claim back. This now paves the way for a full court hearing. The Ropers will seek an injunction forcing the park owners to close or relocate some rides and an order forcing them to pay damages for noise suffered since 1998.

See also 
 Incidents at European amusement parks
 List of theme parks in the United Kingdom

References

External links 

 
 Lost Heritage: full architectural history of the house
 
 Heraldry at Alton Towers
 Alton Towers: Before it was Famous (on themagiceye at Joyland)

 
Merlin Entertainments Group
Grade I listed parks and gardens in Staffordshire
Tourist attractions of the Peak District
Tourist attractions in Staffordshire
Gothic Revival architecture in Staffordshire
1860 establishments in England
Organizations established in 1860
Amusement parks in England
Country houses in Staffordshire
British country houses destroyed in the 20th century
Augustus Pugin buildings